Snap parliamentary elections were held in Bulgaria on 11 July 2021 after no party was able or willing to form a government following the April 2021 elections. The populist party There Is Such a People (ITN), led by musician and television host Slavi Trifonov, narrowly won the most seats over a coalition of the conservative GERB and Union of Democratic Forces parties. Four other parties (the leftist BSP for Bulgaria, the liberal alliance Democratic Bulgaria, the centrist Turkish minority party Movement for Rights and Freedoms, and the anti-corruption Stand Up! Mafia, Get Out!) won seats in the 240-member Parliament as well.

ITN's success was propelled primarily by young voters. The Organization for Security and Co-operation in Europe (OSCE) assessed the election as being "competitive" and with "fundamental freedoms being generally respected." On 6 September, BSP handed back the last mandate of forming a government, meaning the parliament would be dissolved and a third parliamentary election would officially take place in 2021. President Radev declared on 11 September that there would be '2-in-1' elections on November 14 for the first time in Bulgarian history, where voters will be able to vote on the president and the parliament. This decision was taken 'to save treasury costs and voters time'.

Background

The previous election in April saw the ruling GERB party win 75 seats, There Is Such A People (ITN) win 51 seats, BSP for Bulgaria win 43 seats, the Movement for Rights and Freedoms win 30 seats, Democratic Bulgaria win 27 seats and Stand Up! Mafia, Get Out! win 14 seats. After Boyko Borisov of GERB and Slavi Trifonov of There Is Such A People (ITN) were unable to form governments, the BSP stated that they would refuse the mandate to form the government, as the three anti-corruption parties (ITN, Democratic Bulgaria and ISMV) were unwilling to work with them.

Electoral system
The 240 members of the National Assembly are elected by open list proportional representation from 31 multi-member constituencies ranging in size from 4 to 16 seats. The electoral threshold is 4% for parties, with seats allocated according to the largest remainder method.

Parties and coalitions

Parliamentary parties

Other parties 
In May 2021, IMRO – Bulgarian National Movement formed a alliance with fellow neo-nationalists Volya Movement and National Front for the Salvation of Bulgaria in an alliance called Bulgarian Patriots.

Opinion polls 

The opinion poll results below were recalculated from the original data and excludes pollees that chose 'I will not vote' or 'I am uncertain'.

Graphical representation of recalculated data:

Campaign
During the buildup to the April election, Borisov sought to increase his party's share of the rural vote, making campaign stops at small villages in the Rhodope Mountains. The April election showed a clear divide between rural and urban areas of the country; towns favored established parties, while Sofia and other cities went predominantly for new opposition parties, including ITN. Reporters predicted these trends would influence the July election as well.

Results
There Is Such a People received the most votes, finishing around 15,000 votes ahead of GERB–SDS. It was the first time that GERB or a GERB-led coalition had not won the most votes or seats since the party's establishment in 2006. Four other parties (BSP for Bulgaria, Democratic Bulgaria, Movement for Rights and Freedom, and Stand Up! Mafia, Get Out!) also won seats. There Is Such a People performed well among young voters, with 37.4% of Generation Z supporting the party and 30.9% of voters aged 30–39. GERB–SDS received high support from voters aged 40–69, and BSP for Bulgaria received high support from voters older than 70.

International observers from the Organization for Security and Co-operation in Europe said freedoms were respected in the election.

Voter demographics
Gallup exit polling suggested the following demographic breakdown. The parties which received below 4% of the vote are included in 'Others':

Aftermath
The Organization for Security and Co-operation in Europe issued a statement that "Bulgaria's early parliamentary elections were competitive and fundamental freedoms were generally respected. The campaign environment was dominated by mutual accusations of corruption between the former ruling party and the provisional government, as well as by efforts by law-enforcement to curb vote-buying."

The elections resulted in a narrow victory for the newly established There Is Such A People (ITN) party over the ruling GERB party. However, ITN won only 65 out of 240 seats in the National Assembly. Following the elections, ITN opted to try and form a minority government and started talks with potential partners (DB, IBG-NI & BSP) in order to secure their support. Nevertheless, these attempts proved unsuccessful and as a result ITN announced on 10 August that they were withdrawing their proposed cabinet, making a third election more likely. The leader of ITN, Slavi Trifonov, said in a video statement “This means new elections". The mandate to form a cabinet went to GERB. GERB, the party of the previous prime minister, Boyko Borisov, said earlier "it would not try to form a government". The BSP said that if the scenario repeats itself, it would suggest that the current caretaker cabinet becomes permanent. IBG-NI also expressed confidence that it could come up with a solution if handed the mandate to form a government. Trifonov subsequently announced that he would not support any other parties proposing a cabinet. Parliament announced on 2 September that Bulgaria would hold the first round of the presidential election on November 14, with a snap parliamentary election likely to take place in the same month. On 6 September, the BSP handed back the last mandate of forming a government, meaning the parliament would be dissolved and a third parliamentary election would officially take place in 2021. President Rumen Radev declared on 11 September that there would be 2-in-1 elections on November 14 for the first time in Bulgarian history, where voters would be able to vote on the president and the parliament. This decision was taken "to save treasury costs and voters time".

References

July parliamentary election
Bulgaria
2021 07
Bulgaria